The 2020 Venetian regional election took place in Veneto on 20 and 21 September 2020.

Originally scheduled to take place on 31 May 2020, it was delayed due to the coronavirus pandemic in Italy and was part of a round of multiple regional elections in Italy (7 regions out of 20). Venetian voters elected their President and their Regional Council, composed of 51 members including the President.

Luca Zaia, the second-term incumbent President and leading member of the League, was re-elected by a record 76.8% of the vote, the highest tally for a regional President in Italy. The runner-up, Arturo Lorenzoni, backed mainly by the Democratic Party, won 15.7% of the vote.

Regarding parties results, the League ran in this election presenting two lists: the official League list and a list named after Zaia. Combined, the two lists won 61.5% of the vote. The Democratic Party came second with 11.9% and Brothers of Italy came third with 9.6%.

Electoral system
The Regional Council of Veneto is composed of 50 seats. The president elect is the candidate winning a plurality of votes. The council seats are distributed according to proportional representation, with a majority bonus system assigning 60% of the 50 seats to the lists running with the candidate winning more than 40% of the votes.

A single list must win at least 3% of the votes in order to access the seats distribution, while a coalition must win over 5% of the votes.

Parties and candidates

Opinion polls

Candidates

Parties

Results

Results by province and capital city

Turnout

See also 

2020 Italian regional elections

References

Elections in Veneto
2020 elections in Italy
Venetian regional election 2020